Westport/Rideau Lakes Airport  is located  southeast of Westport, Ontario, Canada. It has a  grass runway, accessible from the Perth Road.

References

Registered aerodromes in Ontario